Valeriana congesta, synonym Plectritis congesta, is a species of flowering plant in the honeysuckle family. It is known by several common names, including shortspur seablush and rosy plectritis. It is native to western North America.

Description 
The upper ones lack petioles. The inflorescence is a dense headlike cluster of flowers in shades of bright pink to nearly white.

Range and Habitat 
Valeriana congesta is native to western North America from British Columbia (including Vancouver Island) through Washington and Oregon to southern California, where it is a common plant in coastal forests, seashores, mountain meadows, and other habitats. It is notable for growing in profusion on the serpentine coastal bluffs of Washington Park near Anacortes Washington.

Taxonomy 
The species was first described by John Lindley in 1827 as Valerianella congesta. It was transferred to the genus Plectritis in 1830, and to Valeriana in 2018 when evidence suggested that Plectritis is a clade within Valeriana. , some sources maintain it in Plectritis.

References

External links
 Washington Burke Museum
 Photo gallery

Valerianoideae
Flora of British Columbia
Flora of Washington (state)
Flora of Oregon
Flora of California
Flora without expected TNC conservation status